Stefano Pioli (born 20 October 1965) is an Italian football manager and a former footballer who played as a defender. He is the head coach at Serie A club AC Milan, whom he led to the Serie A title in 2022.

Playing career
Pioli, a native of Parma, started his own playing career for his home city team, Parma. Successively, he was signed by Juventus, with whom he made his Serie A debut in 1984, winning the league title, the European Cup, the European Super Cup and the Intercontinental Cup during his three seasons with the club. After being sold to Hellas Verona in 1987, Pioli moved to Fiorentina in 1989, where he spent six years of his career, before spending two seasons with Padova. After successive season-long spells in Serie C with Pistoiese and Fiorenzuola, he ended his career in 1999 with Colorno of Eccellenza Emilia-Romagna (the sixth-highest level of Italian football at that time; the top level of the Emilia-Romagna regional league system), playing alongside his brother Leonardo.

Style of play
An elegant, tenacious, physical, and mobile defender, Pioli was capable of playing anywhere along the back-line, although he performed best as a man-marking centre-back, or "stopper," in Italian. Considered to be a promising and consistent player in his youth, his career was affected by numerous serious injuries.

Coaching career

Early career
From 1999 to 2002 Pioli coached Bologna's youth team (winning a championship with Allievi Nazionali's team), and Chievo's in 2002–03. In 2003–04, he was appointed as head coach of Serie B club Salernitana. He moved to Modena, still of Serie B, in 2004.

In 2006, Pioli was named as Parma's head coach, therefore returning to his home city and marking his Serie A debut as a manager. However, he was sacked on 12 February 2007 after a 3–0 loss to Roma which brought Parma down to second-last place and replaced by Claudio Ranieri.

On 11 September 2007, Pioli was unveiled as new head coach of Serie B club Grosseto, replacing Giorgio Roselli, who was sacked after three consecutive defeats in the first three league matches, and managed to lead the Tuscan minnows to an impressive mid-table finish in their first season in the Serie B. He then served as head coach of Piacenza for their 2008–09 Serie B campaign. In July 2009, he left Piacenza to join Sassuolo as new head coach of the neroverdi.

Chievo
On 10 June 2010, Pioli was named head coach of Serie A club Chievo on a 12-month contract.

Palermo
On 2 June 2011, Pioli was named head coach of Serie A club Palermo, but he was relieved of his duties just 90 days later.

Bologna
On 4 October 2011, Pioli was named new head coach of Bologna in Serie A, replacing the sacked Pierpaolo Bisoli. After two troublesome seasons with Bologna, both ended with the team struggling in the bottom half of the Serie A table but always escaping relegation, he was removed from his managerial duties on 8 January 2014, with Davide Ballardini appointed as his replacement.

Lazio
On 12 June 2014, it was confirmed Pioli's appointment as new head coach of Lazio in place of Edoardo Reja. In his first season at the club, he led Lazio to a third-place Serie A finish. On 11 June 2015, he was offered a new 2-year contract with an additional year option.

On 3 April 2016, Pioli was sacked after a 4–1 home defeat to city rivals Roma.

Internazionale
On 8 November 2016, Pioli was appointed as the new head coach of Internazionale on an 18-month contract. On 20 November, Inter drew 2–2 against AC Milan in a Serie A Derby della Madonnina match, Pioli's first competitive match as head coach of the club. He was sacked on 9 May 2017. Inter had won 12 of the first 16 Serie A matches that Pioli was in charge of (draw with Milan, losses to Napoli, Juventus and Roma), but this was followed by two draws and five losses in their last seven Serie A matches prior to his sacking.

Fiorentina
On 6 June 2017, Pioli was named new head coach of Fiorentina. He signed for two years with another optional year. Pioli was in charge of the team when on 4 March 2018 central defender and captain Davide Astori died unexpectedly; to honour the memory of the player, Pioli got a commemorative tattoo. On 9 April 2019, Pioli resigned as manager.

AC Milan

2019–20
The day after Marco Giampaolo's sacking, on 9 October 2019, Pioli was appointed as the new coach of AC Milan, on a deal to the end of the season. Pioli's Milan finished the season in sixth place in Serie A. The team scored 63 goals in the competition, their highest total since 2013. On 7 July 2020, Milan defeated Juventus 4–2. Milan scored four goals against Juventus in Serie A for the first time since March 1989, when the score was 4–0. It was Milan's first win against Juventus since 2016.

On 21 July, Pioli reached an agreement with Milan for a two-year deal extension of his contract as head coach to June 2022.

2020–21
On 17 October 2020, Milan won 2–1 against Inter. It was Milan's first Serie A win against Inter since 2016. Milan also won their first four games in a Serie A season for the first time since 1995–96, when Fabio Capello was in charge. Milan scored in 24 consecutive Serie A games for the first time since 1973 (29). On 6th of December Milan beat Sampdoria 2–1, setting a new club record for goals scored in successive Serie A matches (30).

Following a 2–2 draw with Genoa on 16 December, AC Milan were unbeaten in 24 league games: their longest run since 1993. On 23 December, Milan beat Lazio 3–2, becoming the second side in the history of Europe's top five leagues to have scored two or more goals in more than 15 successive games in a single calendar year (after Barcelona, 18 in 1948).

On 9 May 2021, Milan managed to win 3–0 against Juventus, their first away win against them since 2011. Three days later, Pioli's side beat Torino 7–0 in an away game, winning by a seven-goal margin for the first time since June 1959 against Udinese (7–0).

A 2–0 away win against Atalanta on 23 May 2021 confirmed that Milan would finish second in the league table, securing a return to the Champions League for the first time in seven seasons. Milan also set a new all-time record for away wins in a Serie A season with 16; no side has ever done better in Europe’s top five leagues in a single campaign (Real Madrid in 2011–12 and Manchester City in 2017–18 also achieved 16 away wins).

In the UEFA Europa League, Milan reached the round of 16, where they were eliminated by Manchester United.

2021–22: Scudetto victory
As of August 2021, Pioli held the second highest win percentage in Serie A among Milan coaches, behind only Lajos Czeizler.

On 3 October, Milan defeated Atalanta at Gewiss Stadium 3–2, recording successive wins away at Atalanta in Serie A for the first time since 2013.

On 31 October with a 2–1 win against Roma, AC Milan became the fourth team in Serie A history to win 10 of their first 11 games of the season, after Roma, Juventus (twice) and Napoli (twice). The win also ended José Mourinho's run of 43 home games unbeaten in Serie A.

In November, Pioli reached an agreement with the club to extend his contract until June 2023. In December, his Milan side became the second team in Serie A history to win at least 17 away league games in a single calendar year (after Napoli, 18 in 2017).

In the Champions League, the team was knocked out at the group stage, finishing bottom of Group B behind Liverpool, Atlético Madrid and Porto.

On 6 January 2022, Milan beat Roma 3–1, managing to win three consecutive league games against Roma for the first time since 1996.

On 5 February, Milan came back to beat archrivals Inter 2–1 in the Derby della Madonnina after trailing by 0–1; it was the first comeback win for Milan in the derby since 2004. On 13 February after defeating Sampdoria, Milan had picked up 55 points in the league: in the three points-per-win era, only in 2003–04 had they earned as many points after 25 games (64).

On 6 March, Milan beat Napoli 1–0 at Stadio Diego Maradona, moving to the top of the league table and winning two consecutive away games against Napoli in Serie A for the first time since 1981. Milan had also picked up at least 60 points from the first 28 matchdays of a Serie A season for the first time since 2011–12.

On 12 March, Milan defeated Empoli 1–0, reaching 63 points on the top of league table. Seven days later, Milan beat Cagliari 1–0; with that win, Milan had scored at least one goal in 15 consecutive away matches in a single top-flight season for only the second time in their history, also doing so in 1967–68 in Serie A.

Pioli's side sealed the Scudetto on 22 May, the last day of the season, with a 3–0 win against Sassuolo. It was Milan's first league title since 2011, and Pioli's first ever trophy. The team amassed 86 points in total, their best tally since 2005–06.

Pioli's tenure at Milan has brought him the praise of several Italian football personalities and pundits, such as Alberto Zaccheroni, Fabio Capello, Claudio Ranieri, Arrigo Sacchi and Adriano Galliani.

2022–23
On 13 August 2022, Milan defeated Udinese 4–2, securing 3 wins in the first match of the competition for 3 seasons in a row for the first time since 1996. On 31 October 2022 AC Milan announced that Stefano Pioli extended his contract until 30 June 2025.

On 8th of March 2023, Milan beat Tottenham 1-0 on aggregate, reaching UEFA Champions League quarter finals for the first time since 2011-2012 season.

Style of management
Pioli usually uses a 4–2–3–1 formation, or a 3–5–2 formation, with full-backs or wing-backs who actively take part in the team's attacking plays. During his time at Lazio, he often used a 4–3–3 formation. Due to his passion for basketball, he attempted to bring strategic elements of the sport into his own tactical approach as a football manager.

As a head coach of AC Milan, Pioli initially made use of an archaic WM formation, also known as 3–2–2–3. Although presented officially as a 4-3-3, the formation featured the left full-back, Theo Hernandez, in a more advanced position, whereas the right full-back, Davide Calabria’s, attacking presence was significantly limited. Another key feature of this formation was in the center, where two pairs of holding and attacking midfielders formed a square, supporting each other offensively and defensively.

However, with the arrival of Zlatan Ibrahimović in January 2020, Pioli switched Milan's formation to his long favored 4–2–3–1, primarily in order to accommodate for the Swedish ageing yet prolific goalscorer, in which he would play up front without much of a defensive work other than pressing, alternating between the roles of a classical striker, a target forward, and a false 9. The switch of formation also allowed Hakan Çalhanoğlu, an attacking midfielder in a number 10 role, to return to his preferred position as a playmaker behind the main striker, out of which he had been playing for years in various other formations. Ante Rebić and Ismaël Bennacer, the two high-profile new arrivals struggling to fit into the previous coach's system, were given a few more opportunities to prove themselves; as a result, the former got to play in his favorite position as a left winger and quickly topped the club's seasonal goalscoring chart, while the latter formed an efficient double pivot with Franck Kessié, who also significantly improved the quality of his performances.

Personal life
On 14 November 2020, Pioli, alongside his assistant Giacomo Murelli, tested positive for COVID-19 amid its pandemic in Italy. While in quarantine, Pioli continued to be in charge of the team via Zoom and with the help of another member of his coaching staff, Daniele Bonera. Despite these setbacks, Milan had a 3–1 away victory over Napoli in Serie A and a 1–1 away draw with Lille in Europa League.

Career statistics

Player

Managerial statistics

Honours

Player
Parma
Serie C1: 1983–84

Juventus
Serie A: 1985–86
European Supercup: 1984
European Cup: 1984–85
Intercontinental Cup: 1985

Fiorentina
Serie B: 1993–94

Manager
Milan
Serie A: 2021–22

Bologna
Allievi Under-17 National Championship: 2000–01

Individual
Serie A Coach of the Season: 2021–22
Serie A Coach of the Month: October 2021, March 2022, May 2022
Serie A Coach of the Year: 2022
Panchina d'Oro: 2021–22

References

1965 births
Living people
Sportspeople from Parma
Italian footballers
Association football defenders
Parma Calcio 1913 players
Juventus F.C. players
Hellas Verona F.C. players
ACF Fiorentina players
Calcio Padova players
U.S. Pistoiese 1921 players
U.S. Fiorenzuola 1922 S.S. players
Serie C players
Serie A players
Serie B players
UEFA Champions League winning players
Italy under-21 international footballers
Italian football managers
Bologna F.C. 1909 non-playing staff
U.S. Salernitana 1919 managers
Modena F.C. managers
Parma Calcio 1913 managers
F.C. Grosseto S.S.D. managers
Piacenza Calcio 1919 managers
U.S. Sassuolo Calcio managers
A.C. ChievoVerona managers
Palermo F.C. managers
Bologna F.C. 1909 managers
S.S. Lazio managers
Inter Milan managers
ACF Fiorentina managers
A.C. Milan managers
Serie B managers
Serie A managers
Footballers from Emilia-Romagna